This is an incomplete, chronological list of films produced in the cinema of Thailand.
Many older films from Thailand have been lost.

For an alphabetical listing, see :Category:Thai films.

1923–1949

1950s

1960s

1970s

1980s

1990s

2000s

2000

2001

2002

2003

2004

2005

2006

2007

2008

2009

2010s

2010

2011

2012

2013

2014

2015

2016

2017

2018

2019

2020s

2020

2021

2022

2023

See also 

Lists of films
List of films that use Thailand as a location
List of Thailand's submissions for Academy Award for Best Foreign Language Film

References

External links
Top 10 Thai Movie List reviews and previews of the top 10 Thai movies recommended for foreigners
Thai films at the Internet Movie Database – Links to index of the Thai-language titles
Thai Film Database
Thailand box office results at Box Office Mojo
 (Thai) Thailand movies lineup at SiamZone
 Movie release schedule in Thailand 2007 at Pantip.com, with archives going back to 1999
 MovieSeer – Current showtimes in Thailand
 Top 10 Best Thai Movies of All Time at Khmer Bird